This is a list of famous or notable citizens of Belgrade (included in the list are natives as well as permanent and/or temporary residents).

Arts

Architecture
Dragiša Brašovan (1887–1965), modernist architect, one of the leading architects of the early 20th century in Yugoslavia, born in Vršac and lived in Belgrade
Dragutin Djordjević (1866-1933), academic style architect and university professor, born in Loznica and lived in Belgrade
Petar Bajalović (1876-1947), modernism architect, born in Šabac and lived in Belgrade
Zoran Bojović (1936–2018), Serbian and Yugoslav architect and engineer

Literature and poetry
Bruce Sterling, science fiction author, one of the founders of the cyberpunk movement
Charles Simić, Serbian-American poet
Gordana Ćulibrk (born 1952), writer
Meša Selimović, author
Milorad Pavić, poet, prose writer, translator, and literary historian
Nune Popović, Serbian author, activist

Painting

Dragomir Glišić (1872–1957), realism and impressionism painter and war photographer, born in Valjevo and lived in Belgrade
Nadežda Petrović (1873–1915), fauvism painter, born in Čačak and lived in Belgrade
Uroš Predić (1857–1953), realism painter, born in Orlovat and lived in Belgrade

Comics
Aleksa Gajić (born in 1974), comics artist and film director, creator of Technotise and the main author of the animated feature film Technotise: Edit & I
Enki Bilal, comic book creator, comics artist and film director

Sculpture
Lilly Otašević, Canadian sculptor and designer

Multiple art disciplines

Dositej Obradović (1739–1811; born as Dimitrije Obradović), Serbian writer, biographer, diarist, philosopher, pedagogue, educational reformer, linguist, polyglot and the first minister of education of Serbia, born in Ciacova, Romania and lived in Belgrade
Jovan Hristić (1933-2002), Serbian poet, playwright, essayist, literary and theater critic, translator

Entertainment

Fashion and modeling
Bojana Sentaler, Canadian fashion designer
Ivana Sert, Serbian-Turkish TV personality, model, and fashion designer
Roksanda Ilinčić, London-based fashion designer

Film, theater, and television

Dušan Makavejev, Yugoslavian film director, famous for his groundbreaking films of Yugoslav cinema in the late 1960s and early 1970s
Emir Kusturica, filmmaker, double winner of the Palme d'Or at the Cannes Film Festival
Jelena Adžić, Canadian media personality, CBC arts reporter
Marina Abramović, performance artist
Milan Radonjić, TV personality, comedian
Mladen Kalpić, journalist, lecturer, filmmaker, and artist
Nikola Đuričko (born 1974), Serbian actor

Internet
Bogdan Ilić (born 1996; pseudonym Baka Prase), Serbian YouTuber, internet personality, rapper, gamer, actor and entertainer, born in Vranje and lived in Belgrade
Kristina Đukić (2000–2021; pseudonym Kika), Serbian YouTuber and livestreamer

Music

Ana Đurić (born 1978; stage name Konstrakta), singer, Serbian representative in the Eurovision Song Contest 2022
Ana Popović (born 1976), blues guitarist
Ana Sokolović (born 1968), Canadian award winning music composer
Bojana Stamenov (born 1986), singer, Serbian representative in the Eurovision Song Contest 2015
Bojan Zulfikarpašić (born 1968), jazz pianist and composer
Dania Ben Sassi (born 1998), Libyan Amazigh singer, born in Belgrade
David Bižić (born 1975), opera singer
Dejan Miladinović (1948–2017), opera director (Serbia, US, Yugoslavia), professor of Southern Methodist University, Dallas, Texas, and University of Southern California, Los Angeles, California
Dušan Bogdanović (born 1955), guitarist and composer
Goran Bregović (born 1950), Serbian and Yugoslav musician and singer-songwriter, born in Sarajevo, Bosnia and Herzegovina and lives in Belgrade
Goran Simić (1953–2008), opera singer, bass
Ivana Jenkins (born 1983; born Ivana Vujić, stage name Ivy Jenkins), Canadian bass player and designer
Jelena Mihailović (born 1987; stage name Jela Cello), cellist, born in Valjevo and lives in Belgrade
Katarina Pejak, blues singer and pianist
Maja Bogdanović (born 1982), cellist
Marija Šerifović (born 1984), singer, Serbian representative and winner of the Eurovision Song Contest 2007, born in Kragujevac and lives in Belgrade
Milenko Stefanović (1930–2022), classical and jazz clarinetist
Predrag Gosta (born 1972), conductor and harpsichordist
Sara Jovanović (born 1993; pseudonym Sara Jo), Serbian singer, songwriter, dancer, model and actress, born in Rome, Italy and lives in Belgrade
Stevan Stojanović Mokranjac (1856–1914), Serbian composer and music educator, led the Belgrade choir in the late 19th century
Zdravko Čolić (born in 1951), Serbian and Yugoslav singer, born in Sarajevo, Bosnia and Herzegovina and lives in Belgrade

Sciences
Archibald Reiss, scientist
Igor Delijanić, meteorologist
Milutin Milanković, mathematician
Vesna Milosevic-Zdjelar, Canadian astrophysicist, science educator
Živojin Bumbaširević (1920–2008), Serbian orthopedic surgeon and traumatologist, born in Kruševac and lived and died in Belgrade

Scholars
Bogumil Hrabak (1927-2010), Serbian historian, university professor and pedagogue, born in Zrenjanin and lived and died in Belgrade
Boris Begović (born 1956), economic scholar
Đurađ Bošković (1904-1990), Serbian art historian of Serbian medieval architecture
Gordan Lazarević, Canadian musicologist, university department head
Ivan Avakumović, History professor at the University of British Columbia and author
Jelena Kovacevic, American engineering professor and university leader
Paulina Lebl-Albala, feminist, translator, literary critic, literature theoretician, and professor
Thomas Nagel, philosopher
Slobodan Antonić (born 1959), political scientist, sociologist and university professor

Business
Ana Kras, American furniture and fashion designer, photographer, artist
Jelena Behrend, American jewelry designer
Sacha Lakic, French automobile and furniture designer
Veselin Jevrosimović, CEO of IT company ComTrade Group

Politics
Aleksandar I Obrenović (1876–1903), King of Serbia, last ruler of the House of Obrenović
Atilla the Hun, used the city as a military base for his further penetration into the Balkans, between 441 and 443 AD, a decade before his death in 453; he is presumably buried 70 km north of the city
Danica Karađorđević (born 1986), Hereditary Princess of Serbia and Yugoslavia and graphic designer
Filip Karađorđević (born 1982), Hereditary Prince of Serbia and Yugoslavia, born in Fairfax, Virginia, United States and lives in Belgrade
Jovian, Flavius Claudius Iovianus, Emperor of Rome, born in the city in 332 AD, restored Christianity as the official religion of the Roman Empire
Jelisaveta Karađorđević (born 1936), Princess of Yugoslavia, political activist, and former presidential candidate for Serbia
Josip Broz Tito (1892–1980), Yugoslav president, founder of socialist Yugoslavia and co-founder of Non-Aligned Movement
Jovanka Broz (1924–2013), first lady of Yugoslavia and wife of Josip Broz Tito, born in Pećane near Udbina and lived and died in Belgrade
Laurent-Désiré Kabila, former president of the Congo	
Lisa Gavrić (1907-1974; born as Elisabeth Bechmann), Austrian communist, born in Vienna, Austria and lived in Belgrade
Mihailo Obrenović, Prince of Serbia, proclaimed Belgrade the capital city of the Principality of Serbia in 1841 
Novica Antić (born 1978), political activist and president of the Military Trade Union of Serbia
Pavle Karađorđević, Prince of Yugoslavia
Petar I Karađorđević, King of Serbia and later King of Yugoslavia
Slobodan Milošević, late president of Serbia and Yugoslavia
Stefan Dragutin, first King of Serbia to rule the city, made Belgrade the capital of his Kingdom of Syrmia in 1284
Stefan Lazarević, Despot of Serbia, made Belgrade the capital city of Serbian Despotate in 1404
Zoran Đinđić (1952–2003), prime minister of Serbia and mayor of Belgrade
Aleksandar Vučić (born 1970), president of Serbia

Clergy
Atanasije Antonijević (1734-1804), Serbian archpriest of Bukovik, one of the leading people of the Serbian Revolution, born in Bukovik and lived in Belgrade

Philanthropy

Criminals
 Isa Lero "Džamba", criminal

Military
David Albala (1886–1942), military officer, physician, diplomat, and Jewish community leader, born in Belgrade
Dragutin Gavrilović, colonel of the Serbian Army in World War I and the defender of Belgrade in 1915
Mihailo Golubović (1889–1941), Serbian and Yugoslav soldier and a brigadier general of the Royal Yugoslav Army
Milisav Čamdžija (1785–1815), warrior during the First Serbian Uprising, born in Veliki Borak in Belgrade
Stepa Stepanović, field marshal (vojvoda) of Serbian Army
Tasa Donić (1863-1939), Chetnik duke participant in the Serbian liberation wars of 1912–1918, born in Orašac and lived and died in Belgrade

Sports

Basketball
Bogdan Bogdanović, National Basketball Association (NBA) player for the Atlanta Hawks
Marko Jarić, NBA player

Football
Edin Ajdinović (born 2001), football central midfielder, born in Belgrade

High Jumping
Dragutin Topić, high jumper, gold medallist at the 1990 European Athletics Championships

Racewalking
Shaul Ladany, Israeli world-record-holding Olympic racewalker, Bergen-Belsen survivor, Munich Massacre survivor, and Professor of Industrial Engineering

Rugby
Radoslav Novaković, rugby player

Swimming
 Luka Stevanović, swimmer and IT expert

Tennis

Ana Ivanovic, WTA tennis player; former World No. 1 in singles
Daniel Nestor (Danijel Nestorović), Canadian Olympic Gold tennis player
Janko Tipsarević, ATP tennis player
Jelena Dokić, WTA tennis player
Jelena Janković, WTA tennis player; former World No. 1 in singles
Novak Đoković, ATP tennis player (World No.1)

Wrestling
Zurabi Datunashvili (born 1991),  Georgian-born Serbian Greco-Roman wrestler, born in Tbilisi, Georgia and lives in Belgrade

See also
 List of honorary citizens of Belgrade
 List of people from Novi Sad

References

People
Belgrade
Belgrade